Tosin is a Nigerian unisex given name of Yoruba origin meaning "worthy to be served." It is a diminutive version of "Oluwatosin" meaning "God is worthy to be served."

People with the name include:

Tosin Abasi (born 1983), Nigerian American musician
Tosin Adarabioyo (born 1997), English footballer
Tosin Adeloye (born 1996), Nigerian sprinter
Tosin Ajibade (born 1987), Nigerian writer
Tosin Cole (born 1992), British actor 
Tosin Damilola Atolagbe (born 1994), Nigerian badminton player
Tosin Dosunmu (born 1980), Nigerian footballer 
Tosin Jegede, Nigerian singer
Tosin Ogunode (born 1994), Nigerian-Qatari sprinter
Tosin Oke (born 1980), Nigerian triple jumper
Tosin Olufemi (born 1994), English footballer  
Tosin Fakile American Journalist

See also

Tonin (name)
Tosia, name

References

unisex given names
Yoruba given names